Dust for Life was a post-grunge band from Memphis, Tennessee formed in 1999.

Formation and initial success

After the dissolution of the Memphis grunge band Bacchanal, Jason Hughes recruited three members from the local Memphis rock band Spaceman to form DFL. Chris Gavin of the band Burning Blue was added and became the second main songwriter of the group.

In late 1999, DFL self-released a nine-track eponymous album. Then in April 2000, DFL recorded four songs ("Step into the Light", "Dirt into Dust", "Dragonfly", and "Where the Freaks Go") at Ardent Studios. This demo was overnighted to Jeff Hanson, manager of the band Creed, and they were subsequently signed to Wind-Up Records. 

In October 2000, DFL released a second eponymous album containing all new songs with the exception of two re-recorded songs from their 1999 album. The album reached No. 26 on the Billboard Heatseekers chart. Two singles from the album also charted. In 2001, drummer Rick Shelton left DFL to join Course of Nature.

Touring and money troubles

For much of 2001, DFL toured with Creed, 3 Doors Down, The Cult, Tantric, Disturbed, Orgy, Cold and Saliva.

In May 2001, DFL discovered its publishing money had been spent frivolously by their management and subsequently released the company. In July, they parted ways with Wind-Up Records due to contractual elements not being honored. At the end of the year, Jason Hughes also released an album with the band Third Harmonic Distortion. In early 2002, DFL embarked upon a headlining national tour with Tantric. The song "Poison" was used in the movie Dragonball Z Cooler's Revenge.

Separate ways and reformation

After taking a break, the band's two primary songwriters (Hughes and Gavin) began work on the band's next release in July 2003. Later that year, DFL self-released an eight-song EP titled Degrees of Black.

Eventually DFL went on an indefinite hiatus. Chris Gavin formed the band Memphis Sound. Vocalist Jason Hughes formed the band Dark Things with Saving Abel guitarist Scott Bartlett in late 2006 with the intention of releasing an album on Warner Bros. Records. Yet the project never came to fruition. Instead, Hughes and Gavin announced on their MySpace blog in 2007 that DFL was to begin recording new material. In April 2008, the band released The Consequence Of Vanishing. Scott Bartlett was featured on the album. Hughes announced a line of clothing based on the title of the song "Dark Things Betray". The song "Release The Flood" was used by TNA Wrestling as the theme song for Slammiversary (2008).

Another indefinite hiatus

In 2009, Jason Hughes released an album with the band Driving Eternity. The band later changed its name to Driving Into Eternity and released a 5-song EP in 2010.

Chris Gavin currently plays in the bands Kings Trio, White Noise Theory, and the cover band Hi-Fi Allstars. In 2009, White Noise Theory released his first full-length album, Self Titled. The album consists of some tracks from the Degrees Of Black album. In April 2011, White Noise Theory released Dust, a collection of re-recorded DFL songs. In 2011, he released his third album Soul Of The Machine. All albums were released digitally.

DFL is presumably on another indefinite hiatus as their current projects list them as former members of DFL and dustforlifemusic.com is inactive.

Discography

Albums

Singles

References

External links
 Dust For Life on Facebook
 Driving Into Eternity on Reverbnation
 White Noise Theory on Reverbation

Alternative rock groups from Tennessee
American post-grunge musical groups
Musical groups from Memphis, Tennessee